is a Japanese manga series written and illustrated by Yasuichi Oshima. It was serialized in Kodansha's Weekly Shōnen Magazine from 1982 to 1987. Batsu & Terī received the 1984 Kodansha Manga Award for the shōnen category. Kodansha published the manga's 24 tankōbon volumes to December 1987. The manga's license was transferred to Ichijinsha and was published into four wideban volumes.

The manga was adapted into an animated movie by Sunrise. Directed by Mitsuko Kase and Tetsuro Amino, the movie was released in Japan on March 14, 1987. A VHS was released for the movie on April 21, 1987.

The manga was adapted into a side-scrolling action game for the Famicom. The game was developed and released by Use Corporation on July 22, 1987.

Manga
Kodansha published the manga's 24 tankōbon volumes to December 1987. The manga was re-released into 12 kanzenban volumes between March 1991 and August 1991. The manga's license was transferred to Ichijinsha. Ichijinsha published the manga into four aizoban (wide-ban) volumes between July 27, 2008 and November 25, 2008.

Game
The player controls a baseball superhero named Batsu (Bats) who must use baseballs to defeat his opponents. Being hit once reverts him to "normal" Terii (Terry), who swats at his opponents using a baseball bat. Opponents include machinery, humanoids, and animals. Killing opponents while in Terii form results in a larger energy bar.

References

External links
Batsu & Teri at Yasuichi Oshima Official Website 

1982 manga
1987 anime films
1987 video games
Japan-exclusive video games
Nintendo Entertainment System games
Nintendo Entertainment System-only games
Use Corporation games
Shōnen manga
Video games developed in Japan
Winner of Kodansha Manga Award (Shōnen)
Kodansha manga
Ichijinsha manga
Sunrise (company)